Elliott Sharp (born March 1, 1951) is an American contemporary classical composer, multi-instrumentalist, and performer.

A central figure in the avant-garde and experimental music scene in New York City since the late 1970s, Sharp has released over eighty-five recordings ranging from contemporary classical, avant-garde, free improvisation, jazz, experimental, and orchestral music to noise, no wave, and electronic music. He pioneered the use of personal computers in live performance with his Virtual Stance project of the 1980s. He has used algorithms and fibonacci numbers in experimental composition since the 1970s. He has cited literature as an inspiration for his music and often favors improvisation. He is an inveterate performer, playing mainly guitar, saxophone and bass clarinet. Sharp has led many ensembles over the years, including the blues-oriented Terraplane and Orchestra Carbon.

Biography 
Sharp was classically trained in piano from an early age, taking up clarinet and guitar as a teen. He attended Cornell University from 1969 to 1971, studying anthropology, music, and electronics. He completed his B.A. degree at Bard College in 1973, where he studied composition with Benjamin Boretz and Elie Yarden; jazz composition, improvisation, and ethnomusicology with trombonist Roswell Rudd; and physics and electronics with Burton Brody. In 1977 he received an M.A. from the University at Buffalo, where he studied composition with Morton Feldman and Lejaren Hiller, and ethnomusicology with Charles Keil.

From the late 1970s, Sharp established himself in New York's music scene. His compositions have been performed by the hr-Sinfonieorchester, the Ensemble Modern, Continuum, the Orchestra of the SEM Ensemble, Kronos Quartet, the FLUX Quartet, Zeitkratzer, the Soldier String Quartet, the JACK Quartet, and Grammy-winning violinist Hilary Hahn. His work has been featured at festivals worldwide, including the 2008 New Music Stockholm festival, the 2007 Hessischer Rundfunk Klangbiennale, and the Venice Biennale 2003 and 2006. He releases music under his own label (zOaR music) as well as punk label SST and downtown music labels such as Knitting Factory records and John Zorn's Tzadik label. Guitar Player magazine's 30th anniversary issue included Sharp among their list of "The Dirty Thirty – Pioneers and Trailblazers".

He has collaborated regularly with many people, including Christian Marclay, Nels Cline, Bobby Previte, Z'EV, Joey Baron, David Torn, Zeena Parkins, Vernon Reid, and Frances-Marie Uitti, as well as qawaali singer Nusrat Fateh Ali Khan, blues legend Hubert Sumlin, actor/writer Eric Bogosian, jazz greats Jack DeJohnette and Sonny Sharrock, pop singer Debbie Harry, and Bachir Attar, leader of the Master Musicians of Jajouka. He was curator of the monumental sound-art exhibition Volume: Bed of Sound for MoMA PS1, which featured the works of 54 artists including Vito Acconci, Tod Dockstader, John Duncan, Walter Murch, Muhal Richard Abrams, Laurie Anderson, Chris & Cosey, Survival Research Laboratories, Ryuichi Sakamoto, Sonic Youth, and Butch Morris. He also curates the State of the Union CD compilations of one-minute tracks by experimental musicians, and produces records for a wide variety of artists. Sharp describes himself as a lifelong "science geek" having modified and created musical instruments since his teen years, and frequently borrowing terms from science and technology for his compositions.

He has composed scores for feature films and documentaries; created music and sound-design for The Sundance Channel, MTV and Bravo networks; and has presented numerous sound installations in art galleries and museums.

Sharp received the 2015 Berlin Prize in Musical Composition, spending six months as a Fellow-in-Residence at the American Academy in Berlin. He was a 2014 Guggenheim Fellow, a 2014 Fellow at Parson's Center for Transformative Media, and is the subject of Bert Shapiro's documentary Elliott Sharp: Doing the Don't, for Pheasant Eye Film. He was a 2009 Master Artist-in-Residence at the Atlantic Center for the Arts, and a 2010 New York Foundation for the Arts Fellow in music. Sharp received a 2003 Foundation for Contemporary Arts Grants to Artists Award.

In March 2011, Sharp's 60th birthday was celebrated with a weekend of all-star concert events entitled "E#@60", hosted by Brooklyn's ISSUE Project Room.

In March 2021, Sharp's 70th birthday was celebrated with a series of concert events entitled "E#@70", presented by Brooklyn's Roulette.

Sharp lives in lower Manhattan with media artist Janene Higgins and their two children.

Discography

Solo 
 Resonance (1979)
 Rhythms and Blues (1980)
 Looppool (1988)
 K!L!A!V! (1990)
 Westwerk (1992)
 Tectonics (1995)
 Sferics (1996)
 Tectonics – Field and Stream (1997)
 Tectonics – Errata (1999)
 Velocity of Hue (2004)
 Quadrature (2005)
 Sharp? Monk? Sharp! Monk! (2006)
 Solo Beijing (2007)
 Octal Book One (2008)
 Concert in Dachau (2008)
 Tectonics – Abstraction Distraction (2010)
 Octal Book Two (2010)
 The Yahoos Trilogy (2013)
 Octal Book Three (2014) for solo 8-string guitarbass

As a leader 
 Nots (1981) with Art Baron, Olu Dara, Bill Laswell, Diana Meckley, M.E. Miller, Charles K. Noyes, Phillip Wilson
 I/S/M:R (1982) with Michael Brown, Al Diaz, David Linton
 In the Land of the Yahoos (1987) with Christoph Anders, Sussan Deihim, Elizabeth Fischer, David Fulton, Paul Garrin, Shelley Hirsch, Shigeto Kamada, Christian Marclay, Jane Tomkiewicz
 Beneath the Valley of the Ultra-Yahoos (1992) with Samm Bennett, Alva Rogers, Anthony Coleman, Victor Poison-Tete, Eugene Chadbourne, Sussan Deihim, Shelley Hirsch, Barbara Barg, K.J. Grant, Lee Ann Brown
 Dyners Club Guitar Quartet (1994) with Roger Kleier, David Mecionis, John Myers
 Boodlers (1995) with Fred Chalenor, Henry Franzoni
 Boodlers – Counter Fit (1997) with Fred Chalenor, Henry Franzoni, Joseph Trump
 Arc 1: I/S/M (1996) with Art Baron, Michael Brown, Al Diaz, Olu Dara, Bill Laswell, David Linton, Diana Meckley, M.E. Miller, Charles K. Noyes, Bobby Previte, Phillip Wilson
 Arc 2: The Seventies (1998) with, Steve Piccolo, Geoff MacAdie, Stewart Gilbert, Kunda Magenau, Denis Williamson, Murry Kohn, Donald Knaack, Bobby Previte, Jim Whittemore, Chris Vine
 Arc 3: Cyberpunk & the Virtual Stance (1998)
 Autar (2000) with the Bedouin Musicians of Muhammad Abu-Ajaj
 Raw Meet (2002) with Melvin Gibbs, Lance Carter
 Radio Hyper-Yahoo (2004) with Tracie Morris, Eric Bogosian, Sim Cain, Maggie Estep, Steve Buscemi, Lisa Lowell, Jack Womack, Eszter Balint, Edwin Torres, Steve Piccolo, Gak Sato
 War Zones (2008)
 Christian Marclay: Graffiti Composition (2010) Elliott Sharp, Melvin Gibbs, Mary Halvorson, Lee Ranaldo, Vernon Reid
 Electric Willie: a Tribute to Willie Dixon (2010) Elliott Sharp, Henry Kaiser, Queen Esther, Glenn Phillips, Melvin Gibbs, Lance Carter (Yellowbird)
 Err Guitar (2017)
 Syzygy (2019)

with Carbon 
 Monster Curve (1982)
 Datacide (1989)
 Sili/contemp/tation (1990)
 Tocsin (1991)
 Truthtable (1993)
 Autoboot (1994)
 Amusia (1994)
 Interference (1995)
 Serrate (2009)
 Void Coordinates (2010)

with Orchestra Carbon 
 Larynx (1988, 2007)
 Abstract Repressionism: 1990–99 (1992)
 Spring & Neap (1997)
 Rheo~Umbra (1998)
 SyndaKit (1999)
 Radiolaria (2001)

String Quartets 
 Hammer, Anvil, Stirrup (1987) with Soldier String Quartet and Carbon
 Twistmap (1991) with Soldier String Quartet
 Cryptid Fragments (1993) with Margaret Parkins, Michelle Kinney, Sara Parkins, and Soldier String Quartet
 Digital (1986) on Short Stories
 XenocodeX (1996) with Soldier String Quartet
 A Modicum of Passion (2004) with (vocals) Devorah Day, Ben Miller, Joan Wasser; and (strings) Stephanie Griffin, Conrad Harris, Amy Kimball, Garo Yellin
 Elliott Sharp String Quartets 1986–1996 (2003) with Soldier String Quartet and The Meridian Quartet
 Elliott Sharp String Quartets 2002–2007 (2008) with The Sirius String Quartet

Orchestral 
 Racing Hearts, Tessalation Row, Calling (2003)

with Terraplane 
 Terraplane (1994)
 Terraplane – Blues for Next (2000)
 Terraplane – Music fr Yellowman (2002)
 Terraplane – Do the Don't (2003) with Hubert Sumlin
 Terraplane – Secret Life (2005)
 Terraplane – Forgery (2008)
 Terraplane – Sky Road Songs (2012) with Hubert Sumlin
 Terraplane – 4AM Always (2014) – Winner of the Jahrespreis from Deutsche Schallplattenkritik

Duos 
 In New York (1990) with Bachir Attar
 Psycho~Acoustic (1994) with Zeena Parkins
 Psycho~Acoustic – Blackburst (1996) with Zeena Parkins
 Hoosegow: Mighty (1996) with Queen Esther
 Improvisations (1997) with Frances-Marie Uitti
 Revenge of the Stuttering Child (1997) with Ronny Someck
 Poverty Line (1997) with Ronny Someck
 Rwong Territory (1998) with DJ Soulslinger
 High Noon (1999) with Christian Marclay
 Anostalgia (2002) with Reinhold Friedl
 The Prisoner's Dilemma (2002) with Bobby Previte
 Tongue (2004) with John Duncan
 Volcanic Island (2005) with Yasuhiro Usui
 Tranz (2006) with Merzbow
 Feuchtify (2006) with Reinhold Friedl
 Hums 2 Terre (2007) with Franck Vigroux
 Duo Milano (2007) with Nels Cline
 pi:k (2007) with Charlotte Hug
 BASE (2008) with Antoine Berthaume
 Scharfefelder (2008) with Scott Fields
 Protoplasmic (2009) with Boris Savoldelli
 Afiadacampos (2010) with Scott Fields
 Reflexions (2010) with Michiyo Yagi
 Chansons du crépuscule (2017) with Helene Breschand
 Olso (2019) with John Andrew Wilhite-Hannisdal
 Kumuska (2019) with Saadet Türköz
 Alluvial Plain (2020) with Matthew Evan Taylor

Collaborative groups 
 Semantics – Bone of Contention (1987) Elliott Sharp, Ned Rothenberg, Samm Bennett
 Bootstrappers (1989) George Hurley, Mike Watt, Elliott Sharp
 Bootstrappers – GI=GO (1992) Elliott Sharp, Thom Kotik, Jan Kotik
 Downtown Lullaby (1998) John Zorn, Wayne Horvitz, Elliott Sharp, Bobby Previte
 GTR OBLQ (1998) Vernon Reid, Elliott Sharp, David Torn
 Beyond (2001) Joey Baron, Elliott Sharp, Roberto Zorzi
 In the Tank (2006) Natsuki Tamura, Elliott Sharp, Takayuki Kato, Satoko Fujii
 TECK String 4tet (2007) Carlos Zingaro, Elliott Sharp, Ken Filiano, Tomas Ulrich
 Venice, dal vivo (2010) Elliott Sharp, Joey Baron, Franck Vigroux, Bruno Chevillon
 Crossing the Waters (2013) Elliott Sharp, Melvin Gibbs,  (Intakt)
 Expressed By The Circumference (2019) Elliott Sharp, Álvaro Domene, Michael Caratti

As producer 
 John Zorn: Spy Vs Spy (Nonesuch, 1988)
 Mofungo: Bugged (SST, 1988)
 N.A.D + Sonny Sharrock, Denardo Coleman, Henry Kaiser, Christian Marclay, Fred Frith: Ghosts (Heron, 1989)
 Mofungo: Work (SST, 1989)
 Kazamaki/Laar: Return to Street Level (Ear-Rational, 1990)
 The Frigg: Frigg: Brecht (Knitting Factory, 1999)
 PAK: 100% Human Hair (Ra Sounds,  2007)
 Christian Marclay: Graffiti Composition (Dog W/A Bone, 2010)
 Binibon (radio play, produced and directed) (Henceforth, 2010)

As a compilation producer 
 Peripheral Vision (zOaR, 1982)
 State of the Union (zOaR, 1992)
 Island of Sanity (No Man's Land, 1987)
 Real Estate (Ear-Rational, 1990)
 State of the Union (MuWorks, 1993)
 State of the Union (Atavistic, 1996)
 State of the Union 2.001 (Electronic Music Foundation, 2001)
 Timebomb: Live at the Clocktower Gallery (MoMA PS1, 1997)
 Secular Steel (Gaff Music, 2004)
 I Never Met a Guitar (Clean Feed, 2010)

Recorded film scores and score compilations 
 Figure Ground  (compilation) (1997)
 Suspension of Disbelief  (compilation) (2001)
 Soundtrack for the film Commune (2005)
 Soundtrack for the film What Sebastian Dreamt (2005)
 Q-Mix (2009)
 Spectropia Suite (2010) Score to the sci-fi feature film by Toni Dove performed by the 31 Band, Sirius String Quartet, and special guest Debbie Harry

Filmography

Film appearances 
 Elliott Sharp: Doing the Don't (2008 DVD documentary)
 The Old, Weird America: Harry Smith's Anthology of American Folk Music (2007 DVD)
 Elliott Sharp: The Velocity of Hue. Live in Cologne (2007 DVD)
 April in New York with Bobby Previte (2007 DVD)
 Roulette TV: Elliott Sharp. Roulette Intermedium Inc. (2000 DVD)
 Record Player: Christian Marclay (2000 DVD)

Music composed for film 
Spectropia (2006)
Commune (2005)
The Time We Killed (2004)
What Sebastian Dreamt (2003)
Daddy and the Muscle Academy (1991)
Antigone/Rites of Passion (1990)
The Salt Mines (1990)

Opera and theater 
Port Bou (2014): U.S. Premier at Issue Project Room, Brooklyn. European premiere at Konzerthaus, Berlin. The opera depicts the final moments of philosopher Walter Benjamin's life in Port Bou at the French-Spanish border as he flees Nazi-occupied France. Starring bass/baritone Nicholas Isherwood, with pianist Jenny Lin and accordionist William Schimmel, and prerecorded electro-acoustic backgrounds by Sharp. Projection design by Janene Higgins.
About Us (2010): Commissioned in the Autumn of 2009 by the Bayerische Staatsoper in Munich for their 2010 Summer Festival series in the Mini-Opera Pavillon.  A science-fiction story about a Singularity opening our dimension to creatures from another who were only visible to teenagers and were able to catalyze unpredictable and highly creative acts among those teens. All-teenage performers, between the ages of 14–18. In addition to composing the music, Sharp also created the script and story as well as directing the production.
Binibon (2009): Premiered at The Kitchen, NYC. A work of music/theater, concept and music by Sharp with libretto by noted science-fiction author Jack Womack. Binibon is a chronicle of both a murder and the transformation of the East Village in the early 1980s.  It has been released as a radioplay by Henceforth Records. Developed with and directed by Tea Alagic, with projection design by Janene Higgins.
Em/Pyre (2006): Em/Pyre is an opera commissioned by soprano Donella Del Monaco for the 2006 Venice Biennale to be performed by her with her regular ensemble a collection of musicians whose backgrounds and technical skills varied greatly. She also requested that Sharp perform with the ensemble and conduct the piece.  Longtime collaborator Steve Piccolo created the text and sang the baritone parts. Em/Pyre was based on Sharp's interpretation and comparison of Venice in the 15th century with New York City in the late 20th century – two towering city-states whose empires both devolved due to both internal and external cultural and political/economic factors. The composed core materials and defined structure were to be elaborated through conduction and the manifestation of simple algorithmic approaches as well as guided improvisations based on the core materials. A CD of Em/Pyre was released in 2010 on the Italian label Opusavantra Studium.
Innosense (1981): Premiered at Studio PASS in NYC, Innosense is a post-apocalypse opera set in a basement in the Lower East Side. The three "live" characters are the "Three Improvisers", here performed by Charles K. Noyes on percussion, Lesli Dalaba on trumpet, and Sharp on fretless electric guitar, soprano sax, and bass clarinet. Materials for these characters includes vocal and instrumental sounds made by Sharp, found sounds, sound effects, and texts both written by Sharp and appropriated from various sources. Voices for these characters include Victoria Vecna and Felipe Orrego. Recorded November 23, 1981, zOaR music.

Installations 
Suspension (2004): 2-channel installation of video and sound exploring the awareness of momentary stillness in the metropolis. Collaboration with video artist Janene Higgins, for The Chelsea Art Museum, NYC.
Fluvial (2002): A system for flowing audio to create moving sound currents within the enclosed space of the Engine 27 gallery in NYC, Fluvial uses randomization, filtering, and feedback as its basic processing elements to make full use of the room's spatialization potential.
Chromatine (2001): Both musical instrument and sculpture, encouraging visitors to touch the sculpture and cause it to play music.  For the Gallery of the School of Museum of Fine Arts, Boston.
Tag (1997): An interactive audio installation created for the Departure Lounge exhibition at the Clocktower Gallery of MoMA PS1, New York City.
Distressed Vivaldi (1996): Soundtrack created for the Model Home exhibition at the Clocktower Gallery of MoMA PS1, New York City.

Further reading 
 Avantgarde-Musik von Elliott Sharp: Die Vibes Stimmen Interview with Franziska Buhre in the Berlin publication Die Tageszeitung (2015)
 Elliott Sharp: Blues is a Feeling NPR Interview with Jacki Lyden on the program All Things Considered on NPR (2012)
 Elliott Sharp's Warped Passage By Brit Robson, Minneapolis Star Tribune (2012)
 Composer Elliott Sharp's scientific approach is more than a theory By Manny Theiner, Pittsburgh Post-Gazette (2012)
 The 'East Village Nosferatu' Haunts Brooklyn By Steve Dollar, The Wall Street Journal (2011)
 Interview with Elliott Sharp in Guitar Player magazine (2007)
 Interview with Sharp by Mike McGonigal, published in Bomb magazine (2003)
 No One Said He Makes for Easy Listening by Adam Shatz, New York Times Arts and Leisure, July 2002
  (includes video)
 Interview with Sharp by the Portuguese journalist Rui Eduardo Paes, September 2004

References

External links 

 Official website
 , documentary
 , concert film
 , concert excerpt
 
 Discography of Patrice Roussel

1951 births
Musicians from Cleveland
20th-century classical composers
American male classical composers
American classical composers
Bass clarinetists
Bard College alumni
Cornell University alumni
Jewish American musicians
20th-century American Jews
Living people
American rock saxophonists
American male saxophonists
University at Buffalo alumni
Bootstrappers (band) members
Homestead Records artists
Cavity Search Records artists
Glass Records artists
20th-century American saxophonists
20th-century American composers
21st-century American saxophonists
Classical musicians from Ohio
21st-century clarinetists
20th-century American male musicians
21st-century American male musicians
Clean Feed Records artists
Atavistic Records artists
Intakt Records artists
21st-century American Jews
Emanem Records artists
Tzadik Records artists
Knitting Factory Records artists
SST Records artists